The Niue Athletics Association (NAA) is the governing body for the sport of athletics in Niue.

History 
Athletes from Niue participated already at the 1979, 1983, 1991, and 2003 South Pacific Games, the 1993, and 2001 South Pacific Mini Games, and the 2002 and 2006 Commonwealth Games.  They also took part at the 1994 Senior/Open and Junior Oceania Athletics Championships.

It is reported, that NAA was "revived" in 2007, and was affiliated to the OAA as associate member in the year 2009.

TaniRose Fakaotimanava-Lui served as president from October 2007 until July 2011.  Current president is Roz Tafatu-Hipa.

Affiliations 
Oceania Athletics Association (OAA) as associate member
Moreover, it is part of the following national organisations:
Niue Island Sports Commonwealth Games Association (NISCGA)

National records 
NAA maintains the Niuean records in athletics.

External links
Official Webpage
Facebook

References 

Niue
Sport in Niue
Athletics in Niue
National governing bodies for athletics